Tura Magic F.C. is a Namibian football club based in Windhoek. It plays in the Namibia Premier League.

References

2006 establishments in Namibia
Association football clubs established in 2006
Football clubs in Namibia
Namibia Premier League clubs
Sport in Windhoek